Kansas City (abbreviated as KCK) is the third-largest city in the U.S. state of Kansas, and the county seat of Wyandotte County.  It is an inner suburb of the older and more populous Kansas City, Missouri, after which it is named.  As of the 2020 census, the population of the city was 156,607, making it one of four principal cities in the Kansas City metropolitan area.  It is situated at Kaw Point, the junction of the Missouri and Kansas rivers. It is part of a consolidated city-county government known as the "Unified Government".  It is the location of the University of Kansas Medical Center and Kansas City Kansas Community College.

History

In October 1872, "old" Kansas City, Kansas, was incorporated. The first city election was held on October 22 of that year, by order of Judge Hiram Stevens of the Tenth Judicial District, and resulted in the election of Mayor James Boyle. The mayors of the city after its organization were James Boyle, C. A. Eidemiller, A. S. Orbison, Eli Teed and Samuel McConnell.  In June 1880, the Governor of Kansas, John St. John, proclaimed the city of Kansas City a city of the second class with Mayor McConnell present.

In March 1886, "new" Kansas City, Kansas, was formed through the consolidation of five municipalities: "old" Kansas City, Armstrong, Armourdale, Riverview, Wyandotte.  The oldest city of the group was Wyandotte, which was formed in 1857 by Wyandot Native Americans and Methodist missionaries.

In the 1890s, the city saw an explosive growth in population as a streetcar suburb of Kansas City, Missouri. This growth continued until the 1930s. It was one of the nation's 100 largest cities for many U.S. Census counts, from 1890 to 1960, including 1920, when it had a population of over 100,000 residents for the first time.

As with adjacent Kansas City, Missouri, the percentage of the city's most populous ethnic group, non-Hispanic whites, has declined from 76.3% in 1970 to 40.2% in 2010. In 1997, voters approved a proposition to unify the city and county governments creating the Unified Government of Wyandotte County.

Geography

Neighborhoods

Neighborhoods of Kansas City, Kansas, include the following:
 Downtown
 Argentine – former home to the silver smelter for which it was named; it was consolidated with Kansas City in 1910.
 Armourdale – formerly a city, it was consolidated with the city of Kansas City in 1886.
 Armstrong – a small town sitting on the northern bluff of the Kansas River, absorbed in the merger of Wyandotte, Kansas City, and Armourdale.
 Arrickary Subdivision
 Bethel – a neighborhood located generally along Leavenworth Rd., between 72nd and 77th Streets. It was never incorporated as a municipality.
 Fairfax District – an industrial area along the Missouri River.
 Hanover Heights
 Historic Westheight
 Muncie
 Maywood – until the late 1990s, Maywood was a quiet, isolated residential area; it is now part of the "Village West" project that includes the Legends shopping and entertainment district, the Children's Mercy Park soccer stadium, Monarchs' Community America baseball park, the Schlitterbahn amusement water park, the Kansas Speedway racetrack and Hollywood Casino.
 McGrew Grove
 Nearman
 Northeast Neighborhoods
 Parkwood
 Piper
 Polish Hill
 Pomeroy – a late-19thearly-20th-century Train Depot, Trading Post, Saw Mill, and river landing for barges to load and unload.
 Quindaro Bluffs
 Riverview – like Armstrong, a small town on the northern river bluff, absorbed in the merger of Wyandotte, Kansas City, and Armourdale.
 Rosedale – consolidated with Kansas City in 1922.
 Stony Point
 Strawberry Hill
 Turner – community around the Wyandotte-Johnson County border to the Kansas River north-south, and from I-635 to I-435 east-west.
 Vinewood
 Wolcott
 Welborn

Parks and parkways

 City Park

 Wyandotte County Lake Park
 Big Eleven Park
 Boston Daniels' Park (Dedicated to the first Black Chief of Police in the United States)

Climate

Kansas City lies in the Midwestern United States, as well as near the geographic center of the country, at the confluence of the longest river in the country, the Missouri River, and the Kansas River (also known as the Kaw River). The city lies in the humid continental climate (Köppen Dfa) zone, with four distinct seasons, and moderate precipitation, and is part of USDA plant hardiness zone 6. Being located in the center of North America, far removed from a significant body of water, there is significant potential for extremes of hot and cold swings in temperature throughout the year. Unless otherwise stated, normal figures below are based on data from 1981 to 2010 at Downtown Airport. The summer months are hot, but can get very hot and moderately humid, with moist air riding up from the Gulf of Mexico. Winters are cold, with 22 days where the high is at or below the freezing mark and 2.5 nights with a low at or below . The average window for freezing temperatures is October 31 to April 4, while for measurable snowfall, it is November 27 to March 16 as measured at Kansas City International Airport. Precipitation, both in frequency and total accumulation, shows a marked uptick in late spring and summer.

Kansas City is situated on the edge of the "Tornado Alley", a broad region where cold air from the Rocky Mountains in Canada collides with warm air from the Gulf of Mexico, leading to the formation of powerful storms especially during the spring. A few areas of the Kansas City Metropolitan Area have had some severe outbreaks of tornadoes at different points in the past, including the Ruskin Heights tornado in 1957, The Tornado Outbreak Sequence of May 2019 and the May 2003 tornado outbreak sequence. The region can also fall victim to the sporadic ice storm during the winter months, such as the 2002 ice storm during which hundreds of thousands lost power for days and (in some cases) weeks. Kansas City and its outlying areas are also subject to flooding, including the Great Flood of 1993 and the Great Flood of 1951.

Demographics

According to the 2010 census, there were 145,786 people, 53,925 households, and 35,112 families residing in the city.
The median age in the city was 32.5 years. 28.4% of residents were under the age of 18; 9.7% were between the ages of 18 and 24; 27.7% were from 25 to 44; 23.7% were from 45 to 64; and 10.5% were 65 years of age or older. The gender makeup of the city was 49.4% male and 50.6% female.

There were 53,925 households, of which 37.0% had children under the age of 18 living with them, 39.1% were married couples living together, 18.9% had a female householder with no husband present, 7.0% had a male householder with no wife present, and 34.9% were non-families. 28.8% of all households were made up of individuals, and 8.9% had someone living alone who was 65 years of age or older. The average household size was 2.68 and the average family size was 3.32.

The racial composition of Kansas City, Kansas, as of 2010, was as follows:
 White: 52.2%
 Black or African American: 26.8%
 Native American: 0.8%
 Asian: 2.7%
 Pacific Islander: 0.1% 
 Other races: 13.6%
 Two or more races: 3.8%
 Hispanic or Latino (of any race): 27.8%
 Non-Hispanic Whites: 40.2%

As of the 2000 census, the median household income in the city was $33,011, and the median income for a family was $39,491. Males had a median income of $30,992 versus $24,543 for females. The per capita income for the city was $15,737. About 13.0% of families and 17.1% of the population were below the poverty line, including 23.8% of those under age 18 and 11.5% of those age 65 or over.

Economy
Bureau of Labor Statistics data shows that employment in Wyandotte County, Kansas increased 4% from March 2011 to March 2012. The sharp rise in the number of workers resulted in Wyandotte County ranking 19th in the nation and 1st in the Kansas City metropolitan area for job growth as of September 28, 2012.

Kansas City is the home to the General Motors Fairfax Assembly Plant, which manufactures the Chevrolet Malibu and the Cadillac XT4. The Federal Bureau of Prisons maintains its North Central Region Office in the city. In addition, Associated Wholesale Grocers and Kansas City Steak Company are based within the city. The largest employer is the University of Kansas Hospital. The adjoining University of Kansas Medical Center, including the schools of medicine, nursing, and allied health, is also among the city's largest employers (with a student population of about 3,000).

Village West is a business and entertainment district located at the intersection of Interstates 70 and 435. Anchored by the Kansas Speedway, tenants include Hollywood Casino, The Legends At Village West, AMC Theatres IMAX, Cabela's, Nebraska Furniture Mart, Great Wolf Lodge, Monarchs Stadium, the home stadium of the Kansas City Monarchs of the American Association of Professional Baseball, over three dozen restaurants, and Children's Mercy Park, the home stadium of the Sporting Kansas City Major League Soccer franchise. Schlitterbahn Vacation Village, a  resort and waterpark, opened across I-435 from Village West in June 2009, however it has been closed since the end of the 2018 season.

Kansas City was ranked in 2010 as the #7 best city in the U.S. to start over after foreclosure. Average rent in Kansas City is only $788, which is low in relation to the national average of $1,087 spent on rent.

On March 30, 2011, Google announced that Kansas City had been selected as the site of an experimental fiber-optic network that it would build at no cost to the city. Kansas City was chosen from a field of 1,100 U.S. communities that had applied for the network. The network became operational in 2012. Piper, Kansas, became the first full community in the nation (based on actual residential votes and pre-registration counts) to have residential broadband internet network infrastructures using fiber-optic communication of 1Gbit/s download and upload speeds provided by Google Fiber.

Largest employers
According to the city's 2013 Comprehensive Annual Financial Report, the largest employers in the city are:

Government

City government
Kansas City, Kansas, has a consolidated city-county government in which the city and county have been merged into one jurisdiction. As such, it is simultaneously a city, which is a municipal corporation; and a county, which is an administrative division of a state. The Kansas Legislature passed enabling legislation in 1997 and voters approved the consolidation proposal the same year.

The Kansas City, Kansas Police Department was founded in 1898. By 1918, the department had begun taking photographs and fingerprints of all the people its officers had arrested.

The Kansas City, Kansas Fire Department was founded on December 25, 1883. The fire department is part of the Firefighter's Relief Association and the International Association of Fire Fighters. IAFF Local 64 is a charter member and was organized on February 28, 1918. The department has 18 fire stations in the city, and covers an area of approximately 127 square miles. The department also has specialty teams including heavy rescue, hazardous materials, foam team, water rescue, tactical medic, trench rescue, high angle/rope rescue, and technical urban search and rescue. The fire department has four public service programs: a citizens assist program, fire prevention, safe place, and a smoke detector program.

Mayor/CEO
 Tyrone Garner

Board of Commissioners
 At-Large District 1: Melissa Bynum
 At-Large District 2: Tom Burroughs
 District 1: Gayle Townsend
 District 2: Brian McKiernan
 District 3: Christian Ramirez
 District 4: Harold L. Johnson Jr.
 District 5: Mike Kane
 District 6: Angela Markley
 District 7: Chuck Stites
 District 8: Andrew Davis

Law enforcement

The Kansas City Police Department (Kansas) performs law enforcement in the city. The department was established in 1898 with a staff of 46.

Of the statistics available in 2000 based on data collected by the Federal Bureau of Investigation (FBI) as part of its Uniform Crime Reporting Program, which represent from arrests made by State and local law enforcement agencies as reported to the FBI, there were a total of 696 incidents.

Golubski scandal  

Retired KCK police detective Roger Golubski has been accused of sexual assault, protecting organized crime, and obtaining convictions on falsified evidence and coerced perjury.  

Lamonte McIntire was exonerated and released in October 2017 after 23 years in prison for a double murder. His mother claimed Golubski tried to force her into a sexual relationship.  When she refused, Golubski framed her son.   Detectives working the case refused to collect basic evidence.   Former KCK Police Chief Terry Ziegler and other supervisors knew about this.

On September 15, 2022, Golubski was indicted by a federal grand jury in Topeka, Kansas, and arrested on six counts of sexual assault under color of law. Another three-count federal indictment was unsealed November 14, almost two months later:  Golubski and three other men – Cecil Brooks, LeMark Roberson and Richard Robinson – were charged with conspiring, decades ago, to keep young women as sex slaves. At the time of this indictment, Brooks was in a federal prison in Fort Worth, Texas; the locations of the others was unavailable.

Education

Colleges and universities

Public
 Kansas City Kansas Community College
 University of Kansas Medical Center (home of KU's Schools of Medicine, Nursing and Health Professions)

Private
 Donnelly College

School districts

Public
 Kansas City USD 500

 Bonner Springs–Edwardsville USD 204

 Piper USD 203

 Turner USD 202

Private
 Catholic Archdiocese of Kansas City

Secondary schools
 Bishop Ward High School
 Fairfax Learning Center
 J. C. Harmon High School
 Kansas City Kansas Community College: Technical Education Center
 Piper High School, Kansas City in Piper
 F.L. Schlagle High School
 Kansas State School for the Blind (KSSB)
 Sumner Academy of Arts & Science
 Turner High School
 Washington High School
 Wyandotte High School in Kansas City

Public libraries
The Kansas City, Kansas Public Library system has five branch libraries spread throughout Wyandotte County: the Main Library, South Branch Library, Turner Community Library, West Wyandotte Library, and the Mr. & Mrs. F.L. Schlagle Environmental Library in Wyandotte County Lake Park. The system was formed in 1895. In 1899, it came under the authority of the Kansas City, Kansas Public School District Board of Education.

Transportation
River transportation was important to early Kansas City, Kansas, as its location at the confluence of the Missouri and Kansas Rivers afforded easy access to trade. Kansas City Area Transportation Authority provides transportation for 60k riders daily. A portion of I-70 was the first project in the United States completed under the provisions of the new Federal-Aid Highway Act of 1956 (though not the first constructed or to begin construction).

Major highways
Interstate 35 – To Des Moines, Iowa, to the north and Wichita, Kansas, to the south.
Interstate 70 – To St. Louis, Missouri, to the east and Topeka, Kansas/Denver, Colorado, to the west.

Spur routes and roads
Interstate 435 – A bi-state loop through the Missouri and Kansas suburbs, providing access to Kansas City International Airport.
Interstate 635 – Connects the Kansas suburbs with Kansas City, Kansas, and Riverside, Missouri, just north of Kansas City, Missouri.
Interstate 670 – A southern bypass of I-70 and Southern portion of the downtown loop. Signed as East I-70 when exiting from I-35 while traveling north.
US-24-40 – Combination of the US-24 and US-40 highways that pass through Kansas City.
K-5 – A minor freeway bypassing the north of Kansas City, Kansas, connecting the GM Fairfax plant with I-635. K-5 continues as Leavenworth Road west to I-435 then on to Leavenworth, Kansas.
K-7 – A freeway linking Leavenworth County, Kansas, Wyandotte County, Kansas and Johnson County, Kansas.
K-32 – A highway that links Leavenworth County, Kansas, Wyandotte County, and Douglas County, Kansas.

Roads

 US-169, 7th Street Trafficway
 South 18th Street Expressway
 State Avenue and Parallel Parkway
 Kansas Avenue and the Turner Diagonal

Culture
Kansas City, Kansas, has a number of buildings that are listed on the National Register of Historic Places.

Memorial Hall is a 3,500-seat indoor arena/auditorium located in the city's downtown. The venue, which has a permanent stage, is used for public assemblies, concerts and sporting events. In 1887, John G. Braecklein constructed a Victorian home for John and Margaret Scroggs in the area of Strawberry Hill. It is a fine example of the Queen Anne style architecture erected in Kansas City, Kansas.

The Rosedale Arch, dedicated to the men of Kansas City, Kansas, who served in World War I, is a small-scale replica of France's famous Arc de Triomphe. It is located on Mount Marty in Rosedale, overlooking the intersection of Rainbow and Southwest Boulevards.

Wyandotte High School is a public school building located at 2501 Minnesota Avenue. Built in 1936 as a Works Progress Administration project, the school was later designated as a Historical Landmark by the city in 1985 and placed on the National Register of Historic Places on April 30, 1986. In 1889, the Wyandotte County Museum and Historical Society was established as a permanent repository of the county's history. The Argentine Carnegie Library, the only Carnegie library that exists in the metropolitan area, was built in 1917. The library has moved the collections and staff from Argentine to the new South Branch, at 3104 Strong Ave., a few blocks to the west and north, which opened September 26, 2012. The library has turned over the building to the Kansas City, Kansas USD 500.

Other points of interest in the Kansas City, Kansas, area include Fire Station No. 9, Granada Theater, Hanover Heights Neighborhood Historic District, Huron Cemetery, Judge Louis Gates House, Kansas City, Kansas Hall, Kansas City, Kansas Fire Headquarters, Great Wolf Lodge, Schlitterbahn Vacation Village, Quindaro Townsite, Sauer Castle, Scottish Rite Temple, Shawnee Street Overpass, Soldiers and Sailors Memorial Building, St. Augustine Hall, Theodore Shafer House, Trowbridge Archeological Site, Westheight Manor and Westheight Manor District, White Church Christian Church, Wyandotte County Courthouse and the Muncie area.

Media

Kansas City, Kansas, is part of a bi-state media market that comprises 32 counties in northeastern Kansas and northwestern Missouri. The Kansas City media market (ranked 32nd by Arbitron and 31st by Nielsen) includes 10 television stations, and 30 FM and 21 AM radio stations. Due to its close proximity to the Topeka media market, most of the television and radio stations from that city are receivable over-the-air in portions of the Kansas City, Kansas, area. KCTV CBS is licensed to Kansas City, Missouri, but operates out of Kansas City, Kansas.

Newspapers
Kansas City, Kansas is served by the Kansan, a daily newspaper which ceased its print publication and became an online-only paper in 2009. Newspapers serving the city's suburbs include The Record (serving Turner, Argentine and Rosedale), Piper Press (serving Piper) and The Wyandotte West (weekly publication for western Wyandotte County).

Weekly newspapers include alternative publication The Pitch, faith-oriented newspaper The Kansas City Metro Voice, The Wyandotte Echo (which focuses on legal news), The Call (which is focused on the African-American community), business newspaper Kansas City Business Journal and the bilingual publication Dos Mundos.

Broadcast media
The major U.S. broadcast television networks have affiliates in the Kansas City market, including WDAF-TV 4 (Fox), KCTV 5 (CBS), KMBC-TV 9 (ABC), KCPT 19 (PBS), KCWE 29 (The CW), KSHB-TV 41 (NBC) and KSMO-TV 62 (MyNetworkTV). Other television stations in the market include Saint Joseph, Missouri-based KTAJ-TV 16 (TBN), KCKS-LD 25, Lawrence, Kansas-based KMCI-TV 38 (independent), Spanish-language station KUKC-LD 20 (Univision), and KPXE-TV 50 (Ion Television).

Sports

Sporting Kansas City
The Major League Soccer franchise Sporting Kansas City (which was originally known as the Kansas City Wiz for its inaugural year in 1996 and the Kansas City Wizards from 1997 to 2010) currently plays its home games at Children's Mercy Park in the Village West district. The team originally planned to move to Trails Stadium, a planned stadium facility in Kansas City, Missouri, in 2011, but the project was scuttled in 2009. The developer of the planned venue moved the project to the Village West area, near Legends Field, and received the needed approvals in January 2010.

Kansas City Current
The Kansas City Current replaced the now defunct National Women's Soccer League team FC Kansas City which ceased operations in 2017. The Current played its inaugural season at Legends Field (Kansas City), but will play the 2022 season at Children's Mercy Park. The ownership has committed to building a soccer specific stadium across the state line in Kansas City, MO Berkley Riverfront Park.

Kansas City Monarchs
The Kansas City Monarchs is an independent baseball team in the American Association, which moved to Kansas City, Kansas in 2003 and through 2019 played its home games at Legends Field, located adjacent to the Village West development in western Wyandotte County. The team was previously a member of the Northern League (which was not affiliated with Major League Baseball), until it dissolved following the 2010 season. While the remaining Northern League teams became members of the North American League as part of the Northern League's merger with the Golden Baseball League and United Baseball League, the T-Bones joined many other former Northern League teams in the relatively new American Association of Independent Professional Baseball. The T-Bones won the Northern League Championship in 2008 and the American Association Championship in 2018. The Unified Government evicted it from its stadium on October 14, 2019, for nonpayment of rent and utilities.

Auto racing
The Kansas Speedway is an auto racetrack adjacent to the Village West area in western Wyandotte County. The speedway, which is used for races that are part of the NASCAR Cup Series and other racing series, is a  tri-oval with turns which bank at a 15° angle. The track held its first race on June 2, 2001, when the Winston West Series contested the Kansas 100. The top-level NASCAR Cup Series holds the annual Hollywood Casino 400 at the track. The IndyCar Series previously ran the RoadRunner Turbo Indy 300 from 2001 to 2010; with IndyCar driver Scott Dixon setting the overall lap record for all series.

Notable people

Notable individuals who were born in or have lived in Kansas City, Kansas include actor Ed Asner, jazz saxophonist Charlie Parker, Olympic track and field athlete Maurice Greene, Muppet performer Matt Vogel, and musician and actress Janelle Monáe.

Further reading

 Tuttle and Pike's Atlas of Kansas City, Kansas & Vicinity; Tuttle & Pike; 13 pages; 1907.
 Wyandotte County and Kansas City, Kansas - Historical and Biographical; Goodspeed Publishing Co; 932 pages; 1890.

Notes

References

External links

 Unified Government of Wyandotte County/Kansas City, Kansas
 Kansas City, KS/Wyandotte County Convention and Visitors Bureau
 Kansas City map, KDOT
 

 
Cities in Kansas
Cities in Wyandotte County, Kansas
County seats in Kansas
Cities in Kansas City metropolitan area
Populated places established in 1868
Consolidated city-counties
Kansas populated places on the Missouri River